Sophronia sicariellus is a moth of the family Gelechiidae. It was described by Zeller in 1839. It is found in most of Europe, except Iceland, Ireland, Great Britain, the Benelux, Portugal and Croatia.

The wingspan is 13–14 mm.

The larvae feed on Achillea millefolium.

References

Moths described in 1839
Sophronia (moth)